Četníci z Luhačovic (Policemen of Luhačovice) is  a Czech crime television series. Its creative producer was Jan Maxa, the author of the project and main scriptwriter Petr Bok, Tomáš Feřtek also participated in the scripts. Directed by Biser A. Arichtev, Peter Bebjak and Dan Wlodarczyk. The plot of the series takes place in 1919. The central pair of young First Republic policemen were portrayed by Robert Hájek and Martin Donutil. The premiere of the first part took place on 6 January 2017.

The series loosely followed on from the successful series Četnické humoresky. However creative producer of the Czech Television, David Ziegelbauer stated it is a separate project, which is related to the humorous series only by its setting.

Cast
Pavel Zedníček as Hans Gebert, Sergeant who becomes fourth commander of the police station in Luhačovice
Robert Hájek as corporal Martin Láska, a probationary policeman, grew up in the village
Martin Donutil as corporal Zdeněk Cmíral, probationary gendarmerie and son of a regional judge
Ondřej Malý as municipal constable Josef Hejkal, Stána's father
Pavla Tomicová as housekeeper Růžena Hejkalová, Josef's wife and Stána's mother
Dana Batulková as Hortenzie Cmíralová, Zdenek's mother and wife of the regional judge Cmíral
Igor Bareš as district judge Oldřich Janota
Robert Jašków as 1st class warden Václav Stavinoha, the first post-war commander of the police station in Luhačovice
Karel Dobry as 1st Class Guardsman Radomír "Radek" Vlach, war veteran and member of the Italian legions, second commander of the police station in Luhačovice
Jiří Langmajer as chief constable Arnošt Sova, third commander of the police station in Luhačovice
Marek Holý as 1st class constable Hynek Polívka, police constable to help in Luhačovice

References

External links 

Czech crime television series
2017 Czech television series debuts
Czech Television original programming